The 64th edition of the Omloop Het volk was held on 1 March 2008. It was the last time after the event was named Omloop Het Volk before it changed to Omloop Het Nieuwslad. The race was won by Philippe Gilbert after a 50 km solo breakaway.

Gilbert broke clear from the splintered peloton on the Eikenberg, with 50 km and two climbs to go, and held off the chasing group on the flat run-in towards the finish in Ghent. Nick Nuyens won the sprint for second place before Thor Hushovd at one minute from Gilbert.

Results

Gallery

External links

References

2008
Omloop Het Nieuwsblad
Omloop Het Nieuwsblad
Omloop Het Nieuwsblad